Sergey Krivozheyev is a Soviet sprint canoer who competed in the early 1980s. He won two gold medals in the K-4 500 m event at the ICF Canoe Sprint World Championships, earning them in 1981 and 1982.

References

Living people
Soviet male canoeists
Year of birth missing (living people)
ICF Canoe Sprint World Championships medalists in kayak